Demelza Hospice Care for Children  is a Children's hospice and a registered charity (no. 1039561) based in Kent, England, providing palliative, respite, end-of-life and bereavement care to life-limited children and young adults, and their families. The organisation carries the name of Demelza Phillips,  who died from a brain tumour at the age of 24. Demelza had worked at Acorns Children’s Hospice in Birmingham and her parents, impressed by the work they had seen there, wanted to establish a children’s hospice in the South-East of England.  Demelza House opened in 1998.

Services
There are three main areas of service.

The original Demelza House, now known as Demelza Kent is a 10 Bed hospice near Sittingbourne. 
Following a merger with the James House charity in 2004, a 'hospice at home' service was launched covering East Sussex.
These were joined by a 6-bed facility, Demelza South East London, in Eltham in 2009 which also has a range of drop-in services.

Families of deceased children also receive support up to 3 years after the child's death.

Supporters
The organisation has a number of supporters who are termed as 'Vice Presidents'.

These include:Justin Welby the current Archbishop of Canterbury, actors Daniel Radcliffe and Sally Lindsay, Olympic Gold Medallists Robin Cousins and Jayne Torvill, TV Presenter and Strictly Come Dancing judge Len Goodman as well as Sir Martyn Lewis and former England footballer and Match of the Day frontman Gary Lineker.

In 2008, artist Damien Hirst created a work specifically to raise funds for Demelza.  This was sold on 30 September 2008 at Sotheby's Auction House for £769,250 (including buyer's premium).

The Patron is Countess Mountbatten of Burma.

References

External links

Friends of Sussex Hospices

Hospices in England
Health in Kent
Palliative care in England
Sittingbourne
1998 establishments in England